John George Demaray (November 27, 1930 – October 24, 2015) was an American medievalist.

Biography
Demaray was born in Bound Brook, New Jersey to parents John and Marjorie Coyle Demaray and raised in Somerville, New Jersey, where he graduated from Somerville High School. He served in the United States Army, and studied at Notre Dame Law School before completing a doctorate at Columbia University. Demaray met Hannah Disinger while pursuing his doctoral degree and married her in 1960. He taught at several universities, and upon retirement, was granted emeritus status at Rutgers University. Demaray died, aged 84, at Lenox Hill Hospital, where he was seeking treatment for bilateral pneumonia.

Selected publications

References

1930 births
2015 deaths
American medievalists
Historians of the Renaissance
People from Bound Brook, New Jersey
Rutgers University faculty
Somerville High School (New Jersey) alumni
Writers from Somerville, New Jersey
Columbia University alumni
Historians from New Jersey
Notre Dame Law School alumni
21st-century American historians
20th-century American historians
20th-century American male writers
21st-century American male writers
Deaths from pneumonia in New York City